This is a list of productions produced and/or distributed by the Austin-based productions studio Rooster Teeth.

Films

Series

Current series

Upcoming series

Past series

Podcasts and Past Shows

Documentaries

Discography

Releases

Music videos

Publications

Video games published

Subsidiaries

References

External links
 

Rooster Teeth
Rooster Teeth